Etlik is a neighbourhood in the Keçiören district of Ankara Province, Turkey. 'Kasalar' is one of the major units of Etlik. The neighbourhood is located between İncirli, Aşağı Eğlence and Gümüşdere neighbourhoods. It borders the district of Yenimahalle in the south.

References

External links
 Map of Etlik neighbourhood
 Administrative map of Keçiören district

Keçiören
Neighbourhoods of Keçiören